Mama Samba Baldé (born 6 November 1995) is a Bissau-Guinean professional footballer who plays as a winger and right-back for Ligue 1 club Troyes and the Guinea-Bissau national team. He also holds Portuguese citizenship.

Club career

Sporting CP
Born in Bissau, Baldé moved to Portugal before his tenth birthday. In 2013, he signed with Sporting CP for his last year as a junior, arriving for free from Sintrense.

Baldé made his professional debut with the reserves on 11 May 2014, coming on as a 75th-minute substitute in a 1–0 away win against Braga B in the Segunda Liga. In January 2015, he was loaned to third division side Benfica de Castelo Branco until June.

Returned to Sporting B for 2015–16, Baldé scored his first league goal on 30 September 2015, but in a 1–3 home defeat to Olhanense. He totalled 38 appearances during the season, helping to a tenth-place finish in the second tier.

Baldé went on loan to Primeira Liga club Aves in the summer of 2017. His first match in the competition occurred on 11 September, when he started as a right-back in the 2–1 home victory over Belenenses.

In February 2019, Baldé became Aves' all-time scorer in the Portuguese top flight with nine goals.

Dijon
On 27 June 2019, Baldé joined Dijon on a three-year contract. He made his Ligue 1 debut on 10 August, playing the first half of a 1–2 home loss against Saint-Étienne.

Baldé scored seven times during the 2020–21 campaign, but his team suffered relegation as last.

Troyes
On 31 July 2021, Baldé agreed to a four-year deal at Troyes in the same country and league.

International career
Baldé won his first cap for Guinea-Bissau on 8 June 2019, in a friendly against Angola where he replaced Toni Silva (2–0 loss in Penafiel). He was selected in the squad for the 2019 Africa Cup of Nations tournament.

Honours
Aves
Taça de Portugal: 2017–18

References

External links

Portuguese League profile 

1995 births
Living people
Sportspeople from Bissau
Bissau-Guinean footballers
Association football defenders
Association football wingers
Association football utility players
Primeira Liga players
Liga Portugal 2 players
Campeonato de Portugal (league) players
S.U. Sintrense players
Sporting CP B players
Sport Benfica e Castelo Branco players
C.D. Aves players
Ligue 1 players
Dijon FCO players
ES Troyes AC players
Guinea-Bissau international footballers
2019 Africa Cup of Nations players
2021 Africa Cup of Nations players
Bissau-Guinean expatriate footballers
Expatriate footballers in Portugal
Expatriate footballers in France
Bissau-Guinean expatriate sportspeople in Portugal
Bissau-Guinean expatriate sportspeople in France